Area sources are sources of pollution which emit a substance or radiation from a specified area.

Air pollution
For example, area sources of air pollution are air pollutant emission sources which operate within a certain locale. The U.S. Environmental Protection Agency has categorized 70 different categories of air pollution area source. Locomotives operating on certain linear tracks are examples of a line source, whereas locomotives operating within a railyard are an example of an area source of pollution. Other area sources of air pollution are:

 Multiple flue gas stacks within a single industrial plant
 Open burning and forest fires
 Evaporation losses from large spills of volatile  liquids

Water pollution

Water pollution manifestations of an area source—often called nonpoint source pollution—include:
 Surface runoff of fertilizer or pesticides from rainfall or irrigation water
 Widespread failure of a septic drain field
 Dispersal of an oil spill in a water body.

In the 1950s or earlier hydrology transport models appeared to calculate surface runoff, primarily for flood forecasting. Beginning in the early 1970s computer models were developed to analyze the transport of runoff carrying water pollutants, which considered dissolution rates of various chemicals, infiltration into soils and ultimate pollutant load delivered to receiving waters. One of the earliest models addressing chemical dissolution in runoff and resulting transport was developed in the early 1970s by the United States Environmental Protection Agency. This computer model formed the basis of much of the regulatory framework that led to strategies for water pollution control via land use and chemical handling techniques. People produce so much trash that half of it goes in water sources.

See also
Air pollution dispersion terminology
Atmospheric dispersion modeling
List of atmospheric dispersion models
Line source
Point source (pollution)
Roadway air dispersion modeling
Volume source (pollution)

References
 C. Michael Hogan, Leda Patmore, Gary Latshaw, Harry Seidman et al. 1973. Computer modeling of pesticide transport in soil for five instrumented watersheds, U.S. Environmental Protection Agency Southeast Water laboratory, Athens, Ga. by ESL Inc., Sunnyvale, California
 Arnold W. Reitze, J. B. Shapiro and Maurice C. Shapiro. 2005. Stationary Source Air Pollution Law, Published by Environmental Law Institute, 500 pages  ,

Line notes

Pollution